The Steve Miller Band is an American rock band formed in 1966 in San Francisco, California. The band is led by Steve Miller on guitar and lead vocals. The group had a string of mid- to late-1970s hit singles that are staples of classic rock, as well as several earlier psychedelic rock albums. Miller left his first band to move to San Francisco and form the Steve Miller Blues Band. Shortly after Harvey Kornspan negotiated the band's contract with Capitol Records in 1967, the band shortened its name to the Steve Miller Band. In February 1968, the band recorded its debut album, Children of the Future. It went on to produce the albums Sailor, Brave New World, Your Saving Grace, Number 5, Rock Love, Fly Like an Eagle, Book of Dreams, among others. The band's Greatest Hits 1974–78, released in 1978, sold over 13 million copies. In 2016, Steve Miller was inducted as a solo artist in the Rock and Roll Hall of Fame.

History

In 1965, after moving to Chicago to play the blues, Steve Miller and keyboardist Barry Goldberg founded the Goldberg-Miller Blues Band along with bassist Roy Ruby, rhythm guitarist Craymore Stevens, and drummer Maurice McKinley. The band contracted to Epic Records and recorded a single, "The Mother Song", which they performed on Hullabaloo, before Miller left the group and moved to San Francisco.

Miller then formed The Steve Miller Blues Band. Harvey Kornspan, managing partner, wrote and negotiated the band's contract ($860,000 over five years as well as $25,000 of promotion money that was to be spent at the band's discretion) with Capitol/EMI Records then-president Alan Livingston in 1967. Shortly after, the band's name was shortened to The Steve Miller Band at the recommendation of George Martin in order to broaden its appeal. The band, consisting of Miller, guitarist James Cooke, bassist Lonnie Turner, drummer Tim Davis (who replaced the departing Lance Haas on drums) and Jim Peterman on Hammond B3 organ, backed Chuck Berry at a gig at the Fillmore Auditorium that was released as the live album, Live at Fillmore Auditorium. Guitarist Boz Scaggs joined the band soon after and the group performed at the Magic Mountain Festival (festival was held June 10/11, 1967) and the following week at the Monterey Pop Festival (festival was held June 16/17/18, 1967).

In March 1968, while in England, the band recorded their debut album, Children of the Future, at Olympic studios with Glyn Johns as engineer/producer. The album did not score among the Top 100 album chart. The visit itself got off to a poor start also as the group and their entourage were arrested for 'importing drugs and possession of a dangerous firearm'. Kornspan's wife had called Johns asking if he would appear as a character witness in the magistrate's court the day after the arrest and, hopefully, stand bail for them. Johns agreed and the group was released on condition that Johns would 'stand surety for their good behavior' for the rest of their time in England. Both accusations were dropped. The 'dangerous firearm' turned out to be a non-working flare gun that was being used as a wall decoration in the house where the group was staying. The 'imported drugs' happened to be some hash that was buried in the middle of a large fruitcake that had been sent to the group by a stateside friend, totally unbeknownst to anyone in the group.   

Successes included the single "Living in the USA." Brave New World (1969) featured the songs "Space Cowboy" and "My Dark Hour". Paul McCartney, credited as "Paul Ramon", played drums, bass and sang backing vocals on "My Dark Hour". This was followed by Your Saving Grace (1969) and Number 5 (1970). In 1971, Miller broke his neck in a car accident. Capitol Records released the album Rock Love, featuring unreleased live performances and studio material. This is one of two Steve Miller Band albums not to be released on CD, the other being Recall the Beginning...A Journey from Eden. In 1972, the double album compilation Anthology was released, containing 16 songs from the band's first six of seven albums.

The style and personnel of the band changed radically with The Joker (1973), concentrating on straightforward rock and leaving the psychedelic blues side of the band behind. The title track, "The Joker", became a  single and was certified platinum, reaching over one million sales. It was awarded a gold disc by the RIAA on January 11, 1974.

Three singles were released from the album: "Take the Money and Run", "Fly Like an Eagle" and their second  success, "Rock'n Me". Miller credits the guitar introduction to "Rock'n Me" as a tribute to the Free song, "All Right Now".

Book of Dreams (1977) also included three successes: "Jet Airliner", "Jungle Love" (later becoming the song played over the opening credits of the 8th season of the sitcom Everybody Loves Raymond), and "Swingtown". 1982's Abracadabra album gave Steve Miller his third  success with the title track.  Miller's hit pushed Chicago's "Hard to Say I'm Sorry" out of the  spot, just as his "Rock'n Me" had knocked Chicago's "If You Leave Me Now" out of the  spot in 1976.

Released in 1978, The Steve Miller Band's Greatest Hits 1974–78 has sold over 13 million copies.

Bingo!, an album of blues and R&B covers, was released on June 15, 2010. Let Your Hair Down, a companion release to Bingo!, was released 10 months later, on April 18, 2011.

Founding member Tim Davis died from complications due to diabetes on September 20, 1988, at the age of 44. Long-time band member Norton Buffalo died from lung cancer on October 30, 2009. John King (drummer during "The Joker" era) died after a short bout with kidney cancer on October 26, 2010. James Cooke died from cancer on 16 May 2011. Original bassist Lonnie Turner died from lung cancer on April 28, 2013. His time with the band led to songs such as Jet Airliner, Swingtown, Take the Money And Run, Jungle Love and many more. Blues guitarist Jacob Peterson officially joined the band before the Spring 2011 tour. Following Petersen joining the band, longtime guitarist Kenny Lee Lewis switched instruments to become the band's full-time bassist. In 2014, Steve Miller Band toured with fellow San Francisco rock band Journey.

When it was announced that Steve Miller would be inducted into the Rock and Roll Hall of Fame as a solo artist without his band, Miller told Rolling Stone, "It wasn’t my decision, and I didn’t have any input into any of it. If they had asked me what do, I think I would have said, 'Here’s a list of everyone that was ever in my band. They all ought to be here.'"

Members
Current members
 Steve Miller – lead vocals, guitar, harmonica, keyboards (1966–present)
 Kenny Lee Lewis – bass (1983–1987, 2011–present), guitar (1982–1983, 1987–1988, 1994–2011), backing vocals (1982–1988, 1994–present)
 Joseph Wooten – keyboards, backing vocals (1993–present)
 Jacob Petersen – guitar, backing vocals (2011–present)
 Ron Wikso – drums (2021–present)

Former members
 Lonnie Turner – bass, guitar, backing vocals (1966–1970, 1973–1978, died 2013)
 Boz Scaggs – guitar, backing vocals (1967–1968)
 Jim Peterman – keyboards, backing vocals (1966–1968)
 Tim Davis – drums, backing vocals (1966–1970, died 1988)
 James "Curley" Cooke – guitar (1967, died 2011)
 Ben Sidran – keyboards (1968, 1969, 1970, 1972, 1987–1991)
 Nicky Hopkins – keyboards (1969, 1970; died 1994)
 Bobby Winkelman – bass, guitar, backing vocals (1969–1970)
 Ross Valory – bass, backing vocals (1970–1971)
 Roger Allen Clark – drums (1972)
 Jack King – drums (1970–1973)
 Dick Thompson – keyboards (1972–1974)
 Gary Mallaber – drums, keyboards, backing vocals (1976–1987)
 Gerald Johnson – bass, backing vocals (1972–1973, 1981–1983)
 John King – drums (1973–1974, died 2010)
 Les Dudek – guitar (1975)
 Doug Clifford – drums (1975)
 Greg Douglass – slide guitar, backing vocals (1976–1978)
 David Denny – guitar, backing vocals (1976–1978)
 Byron Allred – keyboards (1976–1987, 1990, died 2021)
 John Massaro – guitar, backing vocals (1982–1983)
 Norton Buffalo – harmonica, guitar, backing vocals (1976–1978, 1982–1987, 1989–2009, died 2009)
 Billy Peterson – bass, backing vocals (1987–2011)
 Bob Mallach – saxophone (1987–1996)
 Paul Peterson – guitar (1988, 1991–1992)
 Ricky Peterson – keyboards (1988, 1991)
 Keith Allen – guitar, backing vocals (1989–1990)
 Sonny Charles – backing vocals (2008–2011)
 Gordy Knudtson – drums (1987–2021)

Timeline

Discography

Studio albums
The group has been releasing albums and singles since 1968 and currently has released 18 studio albums, six live albums, seven (official) compilation albums, and at least 29 singles.
 Children of the Future (1968)
 Sailor (1968)
 Brave New World (1969)
 Your Saving Grace (1969)
 Number 5 (1970)
 Rock Love (1971)
 Recall the Beginning...A Journey from Eden (1972)
 The Joker (1973)
 Fly Like an Eagle (1976)
 Book of Dreams (1977)
 Circle of Love (1981)
 Abracadabra (1982)
 Italian X Rays (1984)
 Living in the 20th Century (1986)
 Born 2 B Blue (1988)
 Wide River (1993)
 Bingo! (2010)
 Let Your Hair Down (2011)

Awards

 ASCAP Golden Note Award, 2008.
 Star for "Recording" on the Hollywood Walk of Fame on 1750 Vine Street.
 Steve Miller inducted into The Rock and Roll Hall Of Fame in 2016

See also
 List of bands from the San Francisco Bay Area

References

External links

 
 
 

American blues rock musical groups
American pop rock music groups
American musical trios
Capitol Records artists
Mercury Records artists
Polydor Records artists
Roadrunner Records artists
Musical groups established in 1966
Musical groups from San Francisco
Psychedelic rock music groups from California